Bombaiyer Bombete may refer to:
 Bombaiyer Bombete (novel), a 1976 novel by Satyajit Ray
 Bombaiyer Bombete (film), a 2003 film directed by Sandip Ray, based on the novel